Kavithai Paada Neramillai is a 1987 Indian Tamil-language film directed by Yuhi Sethu, starring Raghuvaran, Amala, Yuhi Sethu and Nassar in lead roles. The film was a remake of the Hindi film Ankush.

Cast 

Raghuvaran
Amala
Nassar
Yugi Sethu

Soundtrack

References 

Tamil remakes of Hindi films
1980 films
1987 films
1980s Tamil-language films